The Panamanian Cycling Federation (in Spanish: Federación Panameña de Ciclismo) is the national governing body of cycle racing in Panama.

It is a member of the UCI and COPACI.

External links
 Federación Panameña de Ciclismo official website

Cycle racing organizations
Cycle racing in Panama
Cycling